Şəhriyar, Nakhchivan may refer to:
 Şəhriyar, Ordubad
 Şəhriyar, Sharur